Step Empress of the Nara clan (11 March 1718 – 19 August 1766) was the second wife of the Qianlong Emperor. She was empress consort of Qing from 1750 until her death in 1766.

Originally a concubine, she was elevated to empress rank after Empress Xiaoxianchun's death in 1748. In her role as empress consort, she accompanied the Qianlong Emperor on many trips, ancestral worship ceremonies, and hunts.

Historical records give little information about her life, and even her appearance. It’s suspected that was due to the Qianlong Emperor destroying all her records and portraits. Although never officially deposed, she lost her authority as chief of the imperial harem in 1765, believed to be because she cut her hair and this action was considered a grave faux pas according to Manchurian custom. The Qianlong Emperor ordered that her four written edicts that bestowed her various imperial titles, as well as the accompanying gifts, be confiscated. In addition, her maid workforce was reduced to two.

Debate over maiden name
In the Draft History of Qing, the future empress is noted as being a member of the Ula-Nara clan. However, the Draft History of Qing is noted to be riddled with errors, due to a hasty publication that precluded an editing process.

Her father, Narbu, is noted in the book Genealogy of the Manchu Clans as being a descendant of Wangginu, a leader of the Hoifa clan, and the family's ancestors are listed under the section "People with the surname Nara in the Hoifa area" as having lived in the Hoifa area for generations. Therefore, some modern publications have stated that the empress is a member of the Hoifa-Nara tribe. But due to the fact that the Ula-Nara clan is the most ancient Nara clan, her ancestors might have changed their last name to Ula-Nara to make their name more noble.

However, at least one author has noted that with members of the Nara clan, the name that comes before Nara merely denotes the geographical area in which the family resided in, and that all members of the clan share the same last name, regardless of their area of residence. In the Factual Record of Qing, when the empress, at the time the secondary consort of Qianlong, was elevated to Consort Xian, she was referred to as being of the Nara clan, rather than as a member of Ula-Nara or Hoifa-Nara.

The debate over the maiden name has manifested itself in two 2018 media portrayals of the Empress' life. In the Story of Yanxi Palace, the character based on the empress was named Hoifa-Nara Shushen, while in Ruyi's Royal Love in the Palace, the character based on the empress was named Ula-Nara Ruyi/Qingying.

Early life
The date of Lady Nara's birth is a matter of debate, with the book Four Genealogies of the Qing Royal House stating that she was born some time in the second lunar month of an unknown year, and at least one modern book stating that she was born on the 10th day of the 2nd month of the 57th year of Kangxi Emperor's reign. She was born to Narbu, a Niru ejen, or assistant captain. The family is of the Bordered Blue Banner.

Before Hongli's enthronement, his father the Yongzheng Emperor, appointed Lady Nara as his secondary consort. She was noted to have gained Hongli's favour during this time. After the death of Yongzheng in 1735, Hongli succeeded him as the Qianlong Emperor, and Lady Nara was granted the title "Consort Xian" on 23 January 1738. Her pleasant character also won the favour of Qianlong's mother, Empress Dowager Chongqing, and on 9 December 1745, she was promoted to "Noble Consort Xian".

As empress
Qianlong's first wife, Empress Xiaoxianchun, died on the 8th day of the 3rd month of the 13th year of Qianlong at the age of 37, on board a boat in Dezhou under circumstances that were not well documented by historical sources.

The emperor's mother, the Empress Dowager Chongqing (posthumously: 𝘌𝘮𝘱𝘳𝘦𝘴𝘴 𝘟𝘪𝘢𝘰𝘴𝘩𝘦𝘯𝘨𝘹𝘪𝘢𝘯) made Noble Consort Xian to administrate the affairs of the six palaces. The emperor duly objected, because he was still grieving the loss of his first beloved empress, and was thus reluctant to take her as his second wife. But he was also hard-pressed to disobey his mother's wishes. As a compromise, he promoted Noble Consort Xian to the position of "Imperial Noble Consort" via an edict issued on the 5th day of the 4th month of the 14th year of his reign, and gave her administrative powers over the harem as an acting Empress. 

An edict to appoint the Imperial Noble Consort as the new empress was issued on the 12th day of the 7th month of the 15th year of Qianlong. The decision was made following a mourning period for Empress Xiaoxianchun. From then on, Empress Nara accompanied Qianlong on many trips, ancestral worship ceremonies, and hunts. From the 17th year of Qianlong to the 20th year, the new empress gave birth to three children: 12th prince, Yongji, an unnamed 5th daughter and the 13th prince, Yongjing, respectively.

Downfall
According to the Draft History of Qing, in 1765, during the 30th year of Qianlong's reign, Empress Nara accompanied the emperor on a tour to Southern China. As the group arrived at Hangzhou, she cut her hair, and was ordered by the emperor to return to the capital. He ordered Fulong'an, the husband of his fourth daughter, to escort the empress to Beijing via waterways.

Contemporary Qing customs held that a Manchurian (typically not held true for other ethnic groups) cut the hair on a queue as a sign of deep mourning. As such the empress' action was considered a grave faux pas, taken as a gesture to curse the Qianlong Emperor and Empress Dowager Chongqing.

Chinese author Li Shu, in her 2019 book on Qing imperial cuisine, made a claim on the exact moment the incident happened, using Qing dynasty records of the portions of food an emperor gave to his consorts and arguing that a granting of food portion represents an act of honor and love by the emperor to his consort. She postulated that the incident happened at some point following breakfast on the 18th day of the leap 2nd month of the 30th year of Qianlong, when the empress received a portion of assorted meat, and before dinner that same day, when Empress Nara was not mentioned as having received any portion of food from the emperor. In addition, starting from that dinner and thereafter, the empress' name was covered up with yellow paper on records of food portion grants.

After the incident and following the empress' return to the capital, she was still given the same amount of daily food and charcoal rations as would be accorded to a woman of her rank, and had five eunuchs and two cooks. On the 14th day of the 5th month of the 30th year of Qianlong, following the emperor's return to Beijing, he ordered that Empress Nara's four written edicts that bestowed her various imperial titles, as well as the accompanying gifts, be confiscated. In addition, her maid workforce was reduced to two, the same amount of maids that a second attendant (the lowest concubine) is allowed to have. In addition, Qianlong conferred the title of "Imperial Noble Consort" on Noble Consort Ling, half a month after his return to the capital. Under the Qing dynasty’s ranking of consorts, an imperial noble consort is only a step below the empress, meaning that while Noble Consort Ling was not explicitly granted administrative powers over the harem, it definitely meant that Empress Nara has fallen out with the emperor.

Death
The empress died on the 7th month of the 31st year of Qianlong. However, the exact date of her death is another matter of debate. The Draft History of Qing, which has accuracy and reliability concerns, stated that she died on the Jiawu, while modern works have listed her death as having happened on the 14th day of the 7th month.

Empress Nara was already seriously ill on the 6th month of that same year, but Qianlong did not otherwise delay a trip to the summer residence in Chengde.

At the time of the empress's death, the emperor was on an annual hunting excursion at the Mulan Hunting Grounds (in the present-day Weichang Manchu and Mongol Autonomous County). He did not end his excursion immediately and head back to the Forbidden City. Instead, he ordered his 12th son, Yongji (Empress Nara's biological son) to return to the palace to handle the funerary affairs. 

By the Qianlong Emperor's order, the funeral was treated as that of an imperial noble consort, but in reality, the ceremony was a much more scaled down affair, with the cancellation of imperial cabinet meetings for five days not carried out, and the cancellation of requirements for princesses, nobles, and high-ranking court officials to attend the mourning sessions. In addition, the casket used was of a much lower quality. For her burial, the empress was laid to rest in the Yu Mausoleum of the Eastern Qing tombs, next to Imperial Noble Consort Chunhui, instead of being entombed next to the emperor's future resting place.

Titles

 During the reign of the Kangxi Emperor (r. 1661–1722):
 Lady Nara (from 11 March 1718)
 During the reign of the Yongzheng Emperor (r. 1722–1735):
 Secondary consort (from 2 December 1734)
 During the reign of the Qianlong Emperor (r. 1735–1796):
 Consort Xian (from 23 January 1738), fourth rank consort
 Noble Consort Xian (from 9 December 1745), third rank consort
 Imperial Noble Consort  (from 20 May 1749), second rank consort
 Empress (from 2 September 1750)

Issue
As Empress:
 Yongji (25th day of the 4th month of the 17th year of Qianlong; 7 June 1752–17 March 1776) the Qianlong Emperor's 12th son
 Fifth daughter (23rd day of the 6th month of the 18th year of Qianlong; 23 July 1753–1 June 1755)
 Yongjing (born 21st day of the 12th month of the 20th year of Qianlong; 22 January 1756–7 September 1757), the Qianlong Emperor's 13th son

In popular culture
 Portrayed as Consort Lan by Tsui Si-fei in The Rise and Fall of Qing Dynasty (1988).
 Portrayed as the Empress by Dai Chunrong in My Fair Princess (1998).
 Portrayed by Li Yun in Qianlong Dynasty (2003).
 Portrayed by Jiang Lili in My Fair Princess III (2003).
 Portrayed by Xu Xiaodan in The Eloquent Ji Xiaolan (2004).
 Portrayed by Sheren Tang in New My Fair Princess (2011).
 Portrayed as Ula-Nara Qingying by Zhang Yan in Empresses in the Palace (2011).
 Portrayed as Empress Ula-Nara by Fan Bingbing in The Lady in the Portrait (2017).
 Portrayed as Hoifa-Nara Shushen by Charmaine Sheh in Story of Yanxi Palace (2018).
 Portrayed as Ula-Nara Qingying/Ruyi by Zhou Xun in Ruyi's Royal Love in the Palace (2018).

See also
 Imperial Chinese harem system
 Royal and noble ranks of the Qing dynasty

Notes on Chinese years
Many historical materials on Empress Nara utilize the ancient Chinese lunisolar calendar, coupled with the Chinese era name system. The following Gregorian calendar dates were derived, using  developed by the Academia Sinica in Taiwan.

References

Sources

Nara
Nara
1718 births
1766 deaths
18th-century Chinese people
18th-century Chinese women